Lectionary 191, designated by siglum ℓ 191 (in the Gregory-Aland numbering) is a Greek manuscript of the New Testament, on parchment leaves. Palaeographically it has been assigned to the 12th century. 
Scrivener labelled it by 263evl.

Description 

The codex contains Lessons from the Gospels of John, Matthew, Luke lectionary (Evangelistarium), on 297 parchment leaves, with lacunae at the end. It contains also one older leaf with the text from the Prophets (Zephaniah 2:11—Haggai 1:5).
It is written in Greek minuscule letters, in two columns per page, 25 lines per page.

There are weekday Gospel lessons.

History 

Usually it is dated to the 12th century. The manuscript once belonged to Arundel collection. Sotheby bought it for the British Museum in 1850.

The manuscript was examined by Bloomfield. It was added to the list of New Testament manuscripts by Scrivener (number 263). Gregory saw it in 1883.

The manuscript is sporadically cited in the critical editions of the Greek New Testament (UBS3).

Currently the codex is located in the British Library (Add MS 18212) in London.

See also 

 List of New Testament lectionaries
 Biblical manuscript
 Textual criticism
 Lectionary 190
 Lectionary 192

Notes and references

Bibliography 

 

Greek New Testament lectionaries
12th-century biblical manuscripts
British Library additional manuscripts